This is a summary of 2010 in Ireland.

Incumbents
 President: Mary McAleese
 Taoiseach: Brian Cowen (FF)
 Tánaiste: Mary Coughlan (FF)
 Minister for Finance: Brian Lenihan (FF) 
 Chief Justice: John L. Murray
 Dáil: 30th
 Seanad: 23rd

Events

January

4 January – Met Éireann says Ireland is experiencing its most extreme cold spell of weather since 1963.
5 January – a bomb alert on Dorset Street in Dublin is caused when officials at a Slovakian airport plant explosives on an innocent civilian and allow him to leave the country on Danube Wings Flight V5 8230 in a security test gone wrong.
7 January – schools remain shut following the holiday period due to extreme weather. Taoiseach Brian Cowen makes his first comments on the matter. Schools remain shut anyway. Minister for Education and Science Batt O'Keeffe later changes his mind.
13 January – an Arkefly Boeing 767 flying from Amsterdam to the Netherlands Antilles is grounded at Shannon Airport after a man claims there is a bomb on board. All 242 passengers and crew are evacuated. 44-year-old Jorge Flores appears in court in Ennis to be charged for this the following day.
22 January – the internationally renowned Waterford Crystal tourist centre in Kilbarry, County Waterford ceases to function.
26 January – Edwin Curry from Kilkenny is sentenced to four years in prison after being convicted of 189 counts of indecent assault against children between 1964 and 1985.
28 January – former national swimming coach Ger Doyle is convicted of 34 counts of indecent assault and one count of sexual assault against children in his care and sentenced to six and half years in prison.

February

 3 February – a fireball is seen across Ireland when a meteoroid explodes at an altitude of 100 miles, and fragments enter the atmosphere. Subsequent public excitement that night causes Astronomy Ireland's website to crash.
8 February – George Lee resigns from Fine Gael and Dáil Éireann with immediate effect, nine months after his election.
12 February – Déirdre de Búrca resigns from the Green Party and Seanad Éireann with immediate effect and criticises her former party leader John Gormley.
12 February – a fire on Dublin's Capel Street destroys a head shop and a sex shop and forces the street to be shut down for the weekend.
13 February – West Jewellers of Grafton Street in Dublin closes down after 290 years.
18 February – Minister for Defence Willie O'Dea resigns after a controversy surrounding his remarks on a rival politician's relationship with brothels. Taoiseach Brian Cowen assigns himself temporary responsibility for the Department of Defence.
23 February – former Green Party leader Trevor Sargent resigns as a Minister of State after accepting that he made 'an error of judgment' in contacting gardaí about a case involving a constituent.

March

8 March – Minister for Arts, Sport and Tourism Martin Cullen resigns from politics after seeking medical advice.
8 March – President of East Timor José Ramos-Horta begins his two-day first official state visit to Ireland by meeting Taoiseach Brian Cowen, urging the country to continue providing economic support as a priority nation and receiving an honorary doctorate from University College Dublin.
9 March – seven people are arrested, five in Waterford and two in Cork, over an alleged plot to assassinate Swedish artist Lars Vilks.
9 March – Dublin's Adelaide and Meath Hospital, Dublin, incorporating the National Children's Hospital in Tallaght blames "systemic and process failures" for more than 57,000 X-rays taken between 2005 and 2009 not being reviewed by medical professionals and admits at least two patients received incorrect treatment, one of whom has since died and the other who is receiving cancer treatment.
9 March – a national strike by taxi drivers leads to work stoppages at the country's three main airports, closes Dublin's O'Connell Street completely and blocks other streets as the High Court orders protesters to leave their sit-in at Commission for Taxi Regulation headquarters.
18 March – former Chairman of Anglo Irish Bank Sean FitzPatrick is arrested at his home and has it searched under Section 4 of the Criminal Justice Act 1984 in Greystones, County Wicklow.
Catholic sexual abuse scandal in Ireland:
20 March – Pope Benedict XVI's special pastoral letter to Irish Catholics on the issue is published by the Vatican to be read the following day in churches.
21 March – a man confronts Bishop of Kerry Dr Bill Murphy in the pulpit in the middle of the Gospel at St Mary's Cathedral, Killarney, while protesters walk out during Mass at St Mary's Pro-Cathedral in Dublin.
23 March – Taoiseach Brian Cowen reshuffles his cabinet.
25 March – a landmark legal ruling allows Limerick pubs to open on 2 April (Good Friday) for the first time anywhere in the history of the state to accommodate fans of Munster and Leinster on the day they play a Celtic League rugby union match in Thomond Park.
29 March – the new Limerick to Galway rail line is officially launched, reopening the rail links between the two cities for the first time in 34 years.

April
2 April – alcohol is served in pubs, bars and hotels in Limerick on Good Friday after business were given special legal permission to do so because of the Munster versus Leinster rugby match in the Celtic League at Thomond Park. Drinkers in Limerick benefit from an "area exemption order", which was introduced in section 10 of the Intoxicating Liquor Act 1962. This exemption was granted by a District Court judge to cover a special event, enabling pubs in Limerick to serve alcohol between the hours of 6 pm and 11.30 pm.
15 April – volcanic ash from the eruption of Eyjafjallajökull in Iceland disrupts air traffic across northern and western Europe, including Ireland.
30 April – RTÉ radio broadcaster Gerry Ryan dies at his home in Dublin, age 53.

May

1 May – a carbon tax on home heating oil and other fuels is introduced by the Irish government.
2 May – a Red C Poll for The Sunday Business Post shows Labour is the second most popular party in Ireland, and that it has overtaken Fianna Fáil.
3 May – further volcanic ash cloud returns over Irish skies, causing more chaos. It goes away again by the 23rd.
3 May – 10 protected birds of prey – 3 red kites, 3 buzzards, 2 white-tailed eagles, 1 golden eagle and 1 peregrine falcon – are found poisoned to death in County Cork, County Donegal, County Kerry, County Kildare, County Leitrim, County Waterford and County Wicklow, in "the worst spate of poisoning in recent years".
5 May – a group of retired and diseased coal miners protest in Dublin in a bid for compensation.
5 May – |James Dillon is sentenced to life imprisonment at the Central Criminal Court for the murder of Roy Collins in Limerick on 9 April 2009.
5 May – the Irish government narrowly defeats by the casting vote of the Ceann Comhairle an opposition motion calling for an immediate by-election in Donegal South-West. Fianna Fáil deputies Frank Fahey and Timmy Dooley accidentally vote with the opposition.
5 May – the skeleton of a child discovered in a sand quarry arrives safely at Donegal County Museum after it was thought to have disappeared.
6 May – Bishop of Clogher Joseph Duffy's resignation is accepted by Pope Benedict XVI.
6 May – the Supreme Court of Ireland rules Acts of the Oireachtas or Statutory Instruments are not constitutionally obliged to be provided in both the English and Irish languages after a ten-year campaign led by Pól Ó Murchú.
6 May – Gerry Ryan is buried.
7 May – Brian Cowen is Taoiseach for two years.
11 May – several substances commonly sold in head shops are immediately outlawed by the Irish government.
11 May – several people are injured by police as protesters attempt to storm Dáil Éireann in a campaign against bank bail-outs. An investigation is launched.
13 May – Taoiseach Brian Cowen gives a speech in which he admits for the first time that "domestic vulnerabilities" nearly caused Ireland's banking system to collapse.
13 May – Tánaiste Mary Coughlan dismisses concerns about Ireland's sovereignty being under threat by the European Commission's "peer review" policy, calling it "populism that is inappropriate and incorrect".
14 May – the High Court rules in favour of shutting the landfill at Kerrdiffstown, Ireland's most complained about landfill.
15 May – hundreds of people protest against Health Service Executive plans to close Loughloe House, a retirement hospital for the elderly in Athlone.
18 May – protesters gather outside Dáil Éireann to condemn cutbacks by the government.
18 May – the Health Service Executive begins its nationwide cervical cancer vaccination campaign.
18 May – Kieran O'Reilly is appointed as Bishop of Killaloe by the Vatican.
19 May – Bishop of Ardagh and Clonmacnois Colm O'Reilly's resignation is accepted by Pope Benedict XVI, but there is no formal announcement and the diocese is not sede vacante.
19 May – the government defeats by 77–72 a Fine Gael motion calling for a date to be set for a by-election due in Waterford.
20 May – 186 Irish peacekeepers serving in Chad return to Dublin, meaning no large battalions are working abroad for the first time in three decades.
21 May – the corpses of 40 children from Bethany Home in Rathgar are discovered in unmarked graves in Mount Jerome Cemetery, Dublin.
22 May – thousands of people protest about the future of Wexford General Hospital in Wexford.
25 May – hundreds of people demonstrate outside Dáil Éireann in pursuit of job creation.
25 May – Captain Gráinne Cronin, the first female pilot at Aer Lingus, retires after 33 years.
26 May – the government defeats by 72–68 the Fine Gael Bye-Election Bill in Dáil Éireann following the government's reluctance to hold by-elections for vacant seats in Donegal South-West, Waterford and Dublin South.
27 May – the Medical Council of Ireland begins a fitness to practise inquiry into two doctors who removed the wrong kidney from "Master Conroy" at Our Lady's Children's Hospital, Crumlin, despite pleas to the contrary from his mother.
27 May – Amnesty International criticises the government's children's human rights record in the organisation's annual report.
28 May – the Health Service Executive reveals that 37 children have died in its care since 2000.
28 May – the final part of the Cork to Dublin motorway opens in County Laois.
31 May – eight Irish nationals are involved in the events surrounding the Gaza flotilla raid carried out by Israeli commandos in international waters, including former United Nations Assistant Secretary-General Denis Halliday and Nobel Peace Laureate Mairead Corrigan. Three Oireachtas members – Aengus Ó Snodaigh, Chris Andrews and Mark Daly – are denied access to the flotilla by Cypriot authorities the day before the raid.

June

1 June – Taoiseach Brian Cowen promises archive storage of electronic and paper records for future use is working fine.
3 June – Dáil Éireann is suspended for ten minutes of the morning due to rowdy scenes in the chamber as the opposition complains of "muzzling of parliament".
3 June – the 1901 Census is made available online for the first time.
4 June – Fianna Fáil Senator Larry Butler resigns the party whip due to an expenses scandal.
4 June – the M3 is officially opened, two months quicker than anticipated.
4 June – the Health Service Executive says 151 children or young adults it knew died in the past decade, in addition to the 37 deaths in its care it announced the previous week.
5 June – Fianna Fáil Senator Ivor Callely resigns the party whip due to an expenses scandal.
7 June – five Irish activists from the MV Rachel Corrie arrive back in Dublin after being deported from Israeli detention.
7 June – dozens of people protest against the Irish government's ongoing attempts to close cancer services at St. Luke's Hospital.
8 June – the Health Service Executive is criticised again, this time after a pregnant woman was told in error by medical staff at Our Lady of Lourdes Hospital in Drogheda that her baby was dead.
8 June – the Health Service Executive publishes a report saying an elder abuse service received more than 1,800 allegations of abuse in the past year.
8 June – the funeral of Daniel McAnaspie takes place.
8 June – the iconic clothes shop, McElhinney's of Athboy, shuts down after 70 years.
9 June – the Junior and Leaving Certificate examinations begin.
9 June – Iran's Foreign Minister Manouchehr Mottaki dodges protesters and flying eggs at the Institute of International and European Affairs in Dublin: two people are kicked and punched, while three people are arrested.
9 June – Dermot Earley retires.
10 June – Ryan Tubridy is announced as Gerry Ryan's replacement on RTÉ 2fm's 9-11 am slot.
11 June – Labour becomes Ireland's most popular political party for the first time in history.
11 June – Galway City Hall explodes.
12 June – thousands of people protest in Mullingar in fear of the Midland Regional Hospital, booing and heckling political rhetoric.
Challenge to the leadership of Enda Kenny by Richard Bruton
14 June – Fine Gael leader Enda Kenny sacks his Opposition Spokesperson on Finance Richard Bruton after learning of his bid to overthrow him.
15 June – Simon Coveney, Denis Naughten, Olwyn Enright, Olivia Mitchell, Fergus O'Dowd, Michael Creed, Billy Timmins, Leo Varadkar and Brian Hayes express their lack of confidence in Enda Kenny.
17 June – Enda Kenny survives a vote of no confidence.
14 June – the Catholic Church pays out-of-court damages of more than €250,000 to a woman abused by paedophile priest Brendan Smyth.
15 June – the Saville Inquiry into Bloody Sunday (1972) is published, prompting an apology from Prime Minister of the United Kingdom David Cameron as the civilians targeted by British paratroopers are confirmed to have been wrongly killed.
15 June – the Irish government survives by five votes an Opposition motion of no confidence in Taoiseach Brian Cowen.
15 June – an Israeli diplomat is expelled from Ireland as punishment for the country's misuse of forged Irish passports in the assassination of Mahmoud al-Mabhouh in Dubai.
16 June – the Dublin Rape Crisis Centre reports a more than 41 per cent increase in calls from the previous year.
17 June – Ireland's Catholic bishops ask the Irish government to provide a free vote for all TDs and Senators on the Civil Partnership Bill, accusing them of trying to make same-sex relationships "as similar as possible to marriage" in what they perceive to be a violation of the Constitution of Ireland. John Gormley says "I thought we had left the era of church interference behind us".
19 June – around 40,000 people avail of the first and final opportunity to walk beneath the River Shannon via the Limerick Tunnel as it officially opens.
21 June – the Irish government drops its challenge to a High Court ruling saying Irish law on transgender rights breaks the European Convention on Human Rights, with Lydia Foy's 13-year battle against the government to be recognised as a woman ending successfully.
21 June – the High Court rules that numerous houses can be repossessed.
21 June – Fine Gael councillor Matt Lyons is elected Mayor of Sligo; Fianna Fáil Councillor Michael Crowe is elected Mayor of Galway.
22 June – a new Waterford Crystal facility opens officially.
22 June – Ireland, represented by Minister for Transport Noel Dempsey, collects an award from the European Transport Safety Council for a 41 per cent reduction in its road deaths since 2001.
23 June – the Railway Safety Commission reports that 2009 was a good year, with no passengers killed or seriously injured and only three trespassers and one construction worker being killed.
23 June – Dáil Éireann legalises the passing of files connected to the death of children in state care from the Health Service Executive to Mary Harney.
24 June – authorities investigate a Health Service Executive training fund from which 31 trips abroad were extracted, including trips to Australia, Hong Kong, the United Kingdom and the United States. The HSE complains about it.
24 June – Mary Harney promises she won't sell off the site of St. Luke's Hospital after she merges it into the Health Service Executive.
24 June – the International Monetary Fund releases the findings on Ireland that were collected over two weeks in May by a delegation.
24 June – Labour Councillor Mick O'Connell is elected Lord Mayor of Cork.
25 June – Taoiseach Brian Cowen and Minister for Communications, Energy and Natural Resources Eamon Ryan attend a meeting of the British–Irish Council in Guernsey.
26 June – thousands of people parade as part of Dublin Pride.
26 June – Diocese of Cloyne child protection delegate Father Bill Bermingham resigns after mishandling a sexual abuse accusation made against a priest.
28 June – the High Court grants permission for 13 repossessions.
28 June – the Health Service Executive announces the closure of Louth County Hospital's emergency department, despite years of campaigning by local people for it to be kept open.
28 June – Fine Gael councillor Gerry Breen is elected Lord Mayor of Dublin; Fine Gael Councillor Marie Byrne is elected Mayor of Limerick.
29 June – the European Commission extends the Bank Guarantee Scheme to include the rest of 2010.
29 June – one member of an alleged Russian spy ring operating in the United States is accused of misusing a false Irish passport.
29 June – the Wildlife Bill, outlawing stag hunting, passes successfully through Dáil Éireann, with the Irish government winning the vote 75-72 (75-71 in a walk-through vote).
30 June – Mary Harney's Health (Miscellaneous Provisions) Bill, designed to dismantle the board at St. Luke's Hospital and merge the hospital's staff and assets into the Health Service Executive, passes through Dáil Éireann.

July
1 July – Dáil Éireann passes the Civil Partnership Bill without a vote. It is signed into law by the President on 19 July.
1 July – Fine Gael leader Enda Kenny names his new team, including his challenger Richard Bruton and former leader Michael Noonan, while James Reilly replaces Bruton as the party's deputy leader.
11 July – 8 people are killed in a traffic collision on the Inishowen Peninsula in County Donegal; it is Ireland's deadliest road accident.

September
14 September – Taoiseach Brian Cowen gives a controversial nine-minute interview to Morning Irelands Cathal Mac Coille from a Fianna Fáil think-in in Galway; the interview receives international attention and leads to increased pressure for Cowen to resign in the days that follow.
29 September – a male protester drives a cement truck as far as the gates of Leinster House early in the morning. It comes with the slogan "Anglo Toxic Bank" and its number plate reads as "bankrupt"; the man is promptly arrested by gardaí.

October
30 October – 10,000 people attend a rally held in opposition to service cuts at Our Lady's Hospital, Navan, County Meath.

November
Tayto Park amusement park opens in County Meath.
1 November – Minister for Health and Children Mary Harney is pelted with red paint while attempting to open a mental healthcare facility in Dublin.
2 November – Fianna Fáil TD Jim McDaid resigned from Dáil Éireann, causing a fourth by-election.
3 November – more than 40,000 students from across the country march upon Dáil Éireann to protest against government plans to increase student fees, the largest student protest for a generation. The Department of Finance is occupied by some students who are then forcibly removed by gardaí.
3 November – the High Court rules as unconstitutional the government's delay in holding one of (since yesterday) four by-elections due in the country, forcing the government to announce the by-election in the Donegal South-West constituency for the end of the month.
4 November – a review by Tallaght Hospital into the non-examination of 58,000 adult X-rays by a radiologist concludes there were "serious delays in reporting results" and that two of the patients experienced delayed diagnosis.
5 November – Minister for Agriculture, Fisheries and Food Brendan Smith reuses a press release to announce a free cheese supplement for the poor, angering the public and generating international headlines.
11–14 November – first Kilkenomics Festival of comedy and economics at Kilkenny.
12 November – Minister for Health and Children Mary Harney is pelted with eggs and cheese in Nenagh.
16 November – an unemployed father asphyxiates his two daughters, aged six and two, and kills himself by crashing his car into a tree in Ballycotton, County Cork. Two adults and two children are found stabbed to death in a house in Newcastle West, County Limerick.
17 November – pensioners gather in Dublin to express opposition to government plans to threaten the impoverished people of Ireland with further cuts.
18 November – the International Monetary Fund (IMF) arrives in Ireland, though Taoiseach Brian Cowen remains in denial.
18 November – more than 1,000 students march peacefully through Galway to protest against government plans to increase student fees.
19 November – Dublin Airport's Terminal 2 opens.
21 November – Eurozone countries agree to a rescue package for Ireland from the European Financial Stability Facility in response to the country's financial crisis. Protesters gather outside Government Buildings on Merrion Street; a ministerial car hits and runs over a protester who is then taken away in an ambulance.
25 November – 2010 Donegal South-West by-election: Pearse Doherty of Sinn Féin is elected to Dáil Éireann.
27 November – about 50,000 people took part in a March for a Better Way from Wood Quay to a rally at the GPO in Dublin to protest against government spending cuts and tax increases.
27 November – a significant amount of snowfall begins and continues into December, as Ireland experiences its third major spell of snowfall in less than two years, with 9 February, and 10 January previous to it.
 30 November – Minister for Justice, Fianna Fáil's Dermot Ahern, announces he will not contest the 2011 general election.
 30 November – Fianna Fáil's Rory O'Hanlon, TD for Cavan–Monaghan and former Ceann Comhairle, announces he will not contest the 2011 general election.

December
 Senator David Norris attempts to read the names of Anglo Irish Bank's bondholders into the Seanad Éireann record but is interrupted and ruled out of order.
1 December – more than 1,000 students march peacefully through Cork to protest against government plans to increase student fees, while dozens of students erect a tent on the grounds of the Department of Education on Dublin's Marlborough Street and hold a "surprise conference" early morning protest.
2 December – amid continuing snowy weather Dublin's main thoroughfare O'Connell Street is shut following an explosion from a gas leak inside Kylemore Café.
7 December – the 2011 Budget is announced by Minister for Finance Brian Lenihan Jnr.
 9 December – Fianna Fáil's Seán Ardagh, TD for Dublin South-Central, announces he will not contest the 2011 general election.
 13 December
State-supported Allied Irish Bank is forced by the minister for finance to cancel planned €40m staff bonuses following public fury and indignation at the prospect.
Fianna Fáil's M. J. Nolan, TD for Carlow–Kilkenny, announces he will not contest the 2011 general election.
 16 December – Fianna Fáil's Beverley Flynn, controversial TD for Mayo, announces she will not contest the 2011 general election.
 17 December – Minister for Transport, Fianna Fáil's Noel Dempsey, announces he will not contest the 2011 general election.
 18 December – Ireland's smallest surviving baby is born weighing just 14oz.
 19 December – the lowest temperature ever recorded in Northern Ireland, -18C.
 20 December
A prison officer is arrested after heroin, cocaine, cannabis and prescription drugs are found strapped to his leg during a search in Mountjoy Prison.
The High Court rules that public rights of way exist in the grounds at Lissadell House, County Sligo.
 21 December – total lunar eclipse during sunrise occurred on the winter solstice.
 25 December – December 2010 is the coldest on record, with a temperature of -17.5 °C recorded in Straide, County Mayo, today.
30 December – controversial former Taoiseach, Fianna Fáil's Bertie Ahern, announces he will not contest the 2011 general election.

Full date unknown
VenueOne, an internet start-up company is founded.

Arts, literature and sciences
4 January – Colm Tóibín wins the prize for fiction at the 2009 Costa Book Awards for his sixth novel Brooklyn.
20 February – the 7th Irish Film and Television Awards take place at the Burlington Hotel in Dublin.
7 March – Richard Baneham wins the Academy Award for Best Visual Effects for his work on Avatar at the 82nd Academy Awards. Four other nominations were unsuccessful.
10 June – Teagasc and University College Cork scientists win the International Dairy Federation's Elie Metchnikoff Prize in Microbiology for their study of lactic acid bacteria.
17 June – Gerbrand Bakker wins the International Dublin Literary Award for his novel The Twin (Boven is het stil).
21 June – the Criminal Courts of Justice wins the Irish Architecture Awards's Public Choice Award.
30 June – Harry Clifton is appointed Ireland Professor of Poetry, succeeding Michael Longley.
26 July – Dublin is named the fourth City of Literature, a permanent title, by UNESCO.
27 July – Emma Donoghue (Room) and Paul Murray (Skippy Dies) are included on the longlist for the Man Booker Prize.
27 August – architects De Blacam & Meagher are the principal exhibitors in the Irish Pavilion at the Venice Biennale.
2 September – Seamus Heaney's poetry collection Human Chain is published and nominated for the 2010 Forward Poetry Prize. It wins on 6 October.
October – Leanne O'Sullivan is awarded the Rooney Prize for Irish Literature for Cailleach: The Hag of Beara.
Book censorship in the Republic of Ireland by the state ceases as all prior bans expire.

Sports

Athletics
12 December – Ireland's Men's team claimed a gold medal in the U-23 event at the European Cross Country Championships in Albufeira, Portugal. The Irish team of David McCarthy, Brendan O Neill, Michael Mulhaire and David Rooney saw off the challenge of France and Spain to claim gold.

Boxing
19 February – Bernard Dunne announces his retirement from the sport.

Car racing
19 June – a co-driver dies during the Donegal International Rally, the first time a competitor is killed in this event, and it ends. A memorial service is held for him the following day.

Gaelic games
 All-Ireland Senior Hurling Championship, May 2010 – September 2010 – Title won by Tipperary.
 All-Ireland Senior Football Championship, May 2010 – September 2010 – Title won by Cork.
11 July – fans attack the referee on the Croke Park pitch after a controversial ending to the 2010 Leinster Senior Football Championship Final between Louth and Meath.

Golf
20/21 June – Graeme McDowell wins the 2010 U.S. Open, becoming the first European to do so since 1970.

International rules football
Announced on 19 February:
23 October – Ireland vs Australia (Gaelic Grounds, Limerick)
30 October – Ireland vs Australia (Croke Park, Dublin)

Rugby union

Six Nations
6 February – Ireland 29-11 Italy
13 February – France 33-10 Ireland
27 February – England 16–20 Ireland
13 March – Ireland 27–12 Wales
20 March – Ireland 23–20 Scotland

John Hayes and Brian O'Driscoll achieve 100 caps against England and Wales respectively, the first and second Irish players to do so.
Tommy Bowe is nominated for "Player of the Championship". He wins.

Heineken Cup
 Munster & Leinster are both defeated in the Heineken cup by French Clubs, Biarritz and Toulouse.

Football
Internationals
 2 March – Brazil 2-0 Republic of Ireland (Emirates Stadium, London Borough of Islington)
Part of the compensation from FIFA for the controversy surrounding France vs Republic of Ireland 2010 FIFA World Cup play-off.
 25 May – Republic of Ireland 2–1 Paraguay (RDS, Dublin)
 28 May – Republic of Ireland 3–0 Algeria (RDS, Dublin)
Second and third full internationals to be played at the RDS and first since 1992.
4 August – Airtricty League XI 1–7 Manchester United The most popular soccer team in Ireland, Manchester United play against a League of Ireland Select XI in the first ever soccer match at the new Aviva Stadium in Dublin.
 11 August – Republic of Ireland 0–1 Argentina (Aviva Stadium, Dublin)
First Irish senior international match to be played at the Aviva Stadium.
17 November – Republic of Ireland 1–2 Norway (Aviva Stadium, Dublin). Friendly match.
2012 UEFA European Championship
 3 September – Republic of Ireland 1–0 Armenia (Hanrapetakan Stadium, Yerevan)
 7 September – Republic of Ireland 3–1 Andorra (Aviva Stadium, Dublin).
 8 October-Republic of Ireland 2–3 Russia (Aviva Stadium, Dublin).
 12 October – Republic of Ireland 1–1 Slovakia (Stadium Pod Dubnom, Žilina).
 2010 League of Ireland
 6 March – Beginning of League of Ireland season.
 25 September – Sligo Rovers win the 2010 League of Ireland Cup.
 29 October – End of League of Ireland season. Shamrock Rovers win the League.
 14 November – Sligo Rovers win the 2010 FAI Cup.

Swimming
14 August – Gráinne Murphy wins a silver medal in the 1,500m final at the 2010 European Aquatics Championships in Budapest, shaving 8 seconds from the Irish record.

Tennis

2010 Australian Open
16 January – Louk Sorensen defeats Daniel King-Turner of New Zealand by 6–4, 7–6(3) to qualify for the 2010 Australian Open, the first Irishman to qualify for a main Grand Slam draw since 1985.
19 January – Louk Sorensen defeats Lu Yen-hsun, of Taiwan by 6–4, 3–6, 6–2, 6–1 in the first round of the 2010 Australian Open, becoming the first Irishman to win a Grand Slam match.
He is defeated to the second round.
24 January – Sam Barry defeats Victor Baluda of Russia by 6–7 6–4 6–3, becoming the first Irishman to win a Junior main draw match.

Winter Olympics
 Ireland participate at the 2010 Winter Olympics in Vancouver. Included are Ireland's first bobsleigh team of pilot Aoife Hoey and brakewoman Claire Bergin, as well as Pat Shannon in the Skeleton and three skiers, including Niall O'Connor.
Ireland's bobsleigh team faced a legal challenge from Australia who were later added as a 21st team.

Births
14 March – Tiger Roll, racehorse.
17 March – Ruler of the World, racehorse.

Deaths

January to July

 1 January 
 Denis Keeley, 79, long-term partner of writer Philomena Lynott, cancer.
 Michael Dwyer, 58, film correspondent with The Irish Times, illness.
3 January – Dick Hill, 71, former controller of programmes of RTÉ Television, sudden death.
4 January – Donal Donnelly, 78, actor (The Godfather Part III, The Dead).
10 January – Danny Fitzgerald, 48, retired Limerick hurler and Gaelic footballer.
17 January – Bob Stakelum, retired Tipperary hurler, Gaelic footballer and referee.
25 January – Pádraig MacKernan, 69, diplomat, Secretary General (Foreign Affairs), Ambassador to France and United States.
27 January – Martin Grace, 67, stunt performer, (James Bond film series, 1967–1985), aneurysm.
28 January – Mick Higgins, 87, retired Cavan Gaelic footballer and All-Ireland-winning captain.
4 February – Tomás Mac Giolla, 86, retired Workers' Party leader and TD.
10 February – Andy Creagh, 56, retired Cork hurler and Gaelic footballer.
16 February – Ronan Lawlor, 21, jockey, riding accident.
19 February – Pádraig Tyers, 84, retired Cork Gaelic footballer. and Irish language scholar
20 February – Niall McCrudden, 45, optician and socialite.
 22 February 
 Paul Clancy, musician.
 Eugene Lambert, 81, puppeteer.
25 February – Henry Barron, 81, Irish judge (granted first divorce, 1997), after short illness.
13 March – Michael 'Haulie' Donnellan, retired Clare hurler.
14 March – Pat Fanning, 91, retired Waterford hurler and President of the Gaelic Athletic Association from 1970 until 1973.
 15 March 
 John Mulhern, 69, horse trainer.
 Peter Moore, 70, retired Meath Gaelic footballer and coach.
31 March – Paddy McNicholl, musician and music promoter (Connolly's of Leap).
3 April – Derek Crozier, 92, Crosaire compiler with The Irish Times since 1943.
18 April – John Forde, 89, former Mayo Gaelic footballer.
19 April – Philip McGuinness, 26, Leitrim Gaelic footballer and hurler.
23 April – Denis Donovan, 60, international bridge player, heart attack.
27 April – Mick English, 77, former rugby union player.
30 April – Gerry Ryan, 53, broadcaster and presenter of RTÉ 2fm's The Gerry Ryan Show.
2 May – Michael Sayers, 98, writer and pioneer of live drama.
9 May – Rita Childers, 95, wife of former President Erskine Childers.
12 May – Bree O'Mara, 42, South African-born Irish novelist.
14 May – Fred O'Donovan, 80, former RTÉ Authority chairman.
19? May – Thomas Caffrey, 92, confectioner.
20 May – Breandán Ó Buachalla, 74, Irish language scholar.
21 May – Bill Long, 78, author and broadcaster.
23 May – Liam Tolan, 17, Meath minor Gaelic footballer, road traffic accident.
25 May – Catherine Molloy, 66, general practitioner.
26 May – Kieran Phelan, 60, Fianna Fáil senator, sudden death.
29 May – Adrian Freeman, Mayo hurler, traffic collision.
1 June – Diarmuid Whelan, 39, history academic.
15 June – Gene Morgan, 84, former Armagh Gaelic footballer.
 22 June – Dinny O'Shea, 78, retired Kerry Gaelic footballer.
 23 June – Dermot Earley, 62, former Chief of Staff of the Irish Defence Forces and former Roscommon Gaelic footballer.

July to December

10 July – Seán Dublin Bay Rockall Loftus, 82, activist, politician and lawyer.
15 July – Derek Nally, music promoter, manager and entrepreneur, heart attack.
19 July – Rory Brady, former Attorney General of Ireland (2002–2007).
24 July – Alex Higgins, 61, snooker player
10 August – Séamus Dolan, 95, former Fianna Fáil TD and Senator, Cathaoirleach of Seanad Éireann (1977–1981)
11 August – Eoghan Mac Aoidh, 24, guitarist, traffic collision.
13 August – Colin Stavely, 68, violinist and leader of the RTÉ National Symphony Orchestra.
20 August – James Dooge, 88, former Fine Gael Senator, Minister for Foreign Affairs (1981–1982)
31 August – Mick Lally, 64, actor (Glenroe).
21 September – Vinnie Doyle, 72, newspaper editor (Irish Independent).
5 October – Moss Keane, 62, former rugby union footballer with Ireland.
8 October – Maurice Neligan, 73, former cardiothurasic surgeon and co-founder of Blackrock Clinic, carried out Ireland's first heart transplant.
 10 October – Ger Feeney, Gaelic footballer.
15 October – Jim Dougal, 65, journalist.
24 October – Carey Joyce, 88, former Fianna Fáil politician.
28 October – Paddy Mullins, 91, former horse racing trainer.
31 October – Johnny O'Connor, 82, former Waterford hurler.
4 November – Larry Roddy, concert promoter and music activist.
15 November – Moira Hoey, 88, actress famous for her starring role as Mary Riordan in The Riordans''.
25 November – Tony Dixon, 52, disc jockey and blogger, brief illness.
29 November – Paddy Comerford, 80, stage actor and comedy performer.
28 December – John Doyle, 80, former Tipperary hurler.
29 December – Jimmy Coffey, 101, former Tipperary hurler.

See also
2010 in Irish television

References